The Latvian language is an extensively inflected language, with complex nominal and verbal morphology.  Word order is relatively free, but the unmarked order is SVO. Latvian has pre-nominal adjectives and both prepositions and postpositions. There are no articles in Latvian, but definiteness can be indicated by the endings of adjectives.

Nouns and adjectives

Latvian has two grammatical genders (masculine and feminine) and seven cases; there are no articles. Adjectives generally precede the nouns they modify, and agree in case, number, and gender. In addition, adjectives take distinct endings to indicate definite and indefinite interpretation:
Viņa nopirka [vecu māju]. "She bought [an old house]."
Viņa nopirka [veco māju]. "She bought [the old house]."

For details about the nominal morphology of Latvian (inflection of nouns, pronouns, numerals, and adjectives), see Latvian declension.

Verbs

Latvian has three simple tenses (present, past and future), and three compound perfect constructions: present perfect, past perfect, future perfect.

Latvian verbs are used in five moods:
indicative;
imperative;
conditional;
conjunctive (Latvian literature, however, does not make a distinction between conditional and conjunctive. Even if such a distinction is made both of them are morphologically identical – ending in -u.);
quotative also known as relative or inferential mood (some authors distinguish analytically derived jussive as a subset of quotative, others, however, insist that a simple addition of a conjunction (lai) is not sufficient basis for distinguishing this grammatical construction as a grammatical mood); and
debitive (for expressing obligation).

The relations between tenses and moods are shown in the following table. (The table does not include quotative.)

Latvian verbs have two voices, active and passive. The passive voice is analytic, combining an auxiliary verb (tikt "become", būt "be", or more rarely, tapt "become") and the past passive participle form of the verb. Reflexive verbs are marked morphologically by the suffix -s.

Conjugation classes
Unlike, for example, Romance languages where conjugation classes are assigned based on thematic vowels (e.g., -are, -ere, -ire forming, respectively, the 1st, 2nd and 3rd conjugation in Italian) Latvian verbs are classified in conjugations regardless of whether they end in -āt, -ēt, -īt, -ot or -t. The classification depends on whether the verb stem has a thematic vowel, and if so, whether it is retained in present tense.

 The first conjugation class is characterized by an absence of the thematic vowel in infinitive, present as well as past. Furthermore 1st conjugation verbs are always monosyllabic and their stems undergo sound shifts. Based on these sound shifts they are further divided in 5 subcategories. Sound shifts bolded below

 The second conjugation class is characterized by retaining the thematic vowel in infinitive, past as well as present. 1st person singular present and past tenses match.

 Verbs of the third conjugation class retain the thematic vowel in infinitive and past, however, it is absent in present and the stem takes on the full set of endings unlike 1st and 2nd conjugation where 2nd person singular and 3rd person present endings -i and -a are either absent or have given way to the thematic vowel.

The 3rd conjugation is divided into 2 subgroups, the 1st one containing the thematic vowel ī, and the 2nd subgroup – all other vowels. The only difference  between the two subgroups is that verbs belonging to the 2nd subgroup do not take on the 3rd person present tense ending -a. dziedāt, es dziedu, tu dziedi but viņš dzied unlike viņš lasa.

Beside the three conjugations, there are three verbs characterized by different stems in present, past as well as infinitive. These verbs are referred to as "irregular" (nekārtni or neregulāri.) Irregular verbs and their stem changes are:

būt (esmu, biju) – to be (I am, I was)
iet (eju, gāju) – to go (I go, I went)
dot (dodu, devu) – to give (I give, I gave)

A verb's conjugation pattern can be deduced from three base forms: the infinitive form, the present stem and the past stem. The following table shows the correspondence between the base stem and the tense/mood.

Reference

Literature 

 
 
 
 
 
 
 
 
 
 

 
Languages of Latvia
Latvian language